The 1979–80 Utah State Aggies men's basketball team represented Utah State University during the 1979–80 men's college basketball season. They received the conference's automatic bid to the NCAA Tournament where they lost in the first round to Clemson.

Roster

Schedule

|-
!colspan=12 style=|PCAA tournament

|-
!colspan=12 style=|NCAA Tournament

Notes

References 

Utah State Aggies men's basketball seasons
Utah State Aggies men's basketball
Utah State Aggies men's basketball
Utah State
Utah State